XFH may refer to:
 Hall XFH, a prototype U.S. Navy fighter aircraft of the 1932s
 X-ray fluorescence holography, an imaging method